Ernie Altbacker (known as E.J. Altbacker) is a screenwriter who has worked on television shows including Static Shock, Ben 10, Spider-Man, Jay Jay the Jet Plane, Mucha Lucha, and Green Lantern: The Animated Series. He holds an MFA in screenwriting from the American Film Institute and an undergraduate degree from the University of Notre Dame.
He has also written a series of six books for children, Shark Wars, published by Razorbill, an imprint of Penguin.

Publications
Altbacker, E. J. Shark Wars. New York: Brazzaville, 2011.  In 445 libraries according to WordCat

Screenwriting credits
 series head writer denoted in bold

Television
 Extreme Ghostbusters (1997)
 Spider-Man (1997)
 Heavy Gear: The Animated Series (2002)
 Static Shock (2003)
 ¡Mucha Lucha! (2003)
 Jay Jay the Jet Plane (2005)
 Combo Niños (2008)
 Ben 10: Omniverse (2010-2011)
 Rekkit Rabbit (2011)
 Green Lantern: The Animated Series (2011-2013)
 Monsuno (2013)
 Spooksville (2013-2014)
 Nexo Knights (2016-2017)
 Justice League Action (2017)
 Niko and the Sword of Light (2017-2018)
 Legend Quest (2017, 2019)
 Lost in Oz (2018)
 Cannon Busters (2019)

Films
 Angel on Abbey Street (1999)
 Scooby-Doo! and WWE: Curse of the Speed Demon (2016)
 Justice League Dark (2017)
 Teen Titans: The Judas Contract (2017)
 Batman: Hush (2019)
 DC Showcase: The Phantom Stranger (2020)
 Justice League Dark: Apokolips War (2020)
 Green Lantern: Beware My Power (2022)

References

Year of birth missing (living people)
Living people
American children's writers
American male screenwriters